The Samoan starling (Aplonis atrifusca) is a large starling of the family Sturnidae. It is found in the Samoan Islands. The species has a dark brown, glossy appearance, with a long bill. Its natural habitat is tropical moist forest on volcanic islands, where it is common and more conspicuous than the Polynesian starling, which is found in the same habitat. Vocalizations include various whistles and other sounds. This starling feeds on a variety of fruits, especially guava, and insects. Little is known of its mating or social habits, but it appears to nest year-round, in tree cavities. Its eggs are pale blue.

References

External links
Birds of the National Park of American Samoa

Samoan starling
Birds of Samoa
Samoan starling
Taxonomy articles created by Polbot
Taxa named by Titian Peale